Gerli Padar (born 6 November 1979) is an Estonian singer and actress. She represented Estonia in the Eurovision Song Contest 2007. She is the sister of Tanel Padar, who won the Eurovision Song Contest in 2001 for Estonia.

Career
Padar has performed in several hit Estonian musicals including her starring roles as Sally in Cabaret, as Florence in Chess and as Lotte in Lotte, the Detective. As of 2011, she has released one solo album. Padar represented Estonia in the Eurovision Song Contest 2007 with the song "Partners in Crime" which failed to qualify for the final.

In 2018, she competed in Eesti Laul 2018 together with Eliis Pärna with the song Taevas (performed in the semifinal in English as "Sky"), which came last in the final.

References

External links

Living people
Eurovision Song Contest entrants for Estonia
21st-century Estonian women singers
Estonian pop singers
Eurovision Song Contest entrants of 2007
People from Haljala Parish
20th-century Estonian women singers
1979 births
Eesti Laul contestants